Noel López de la Fuente, also known as Noel (born 17 March 2003), is a Spanish footballer who plays as a forward for Real Madrid Castilla.

Club career 
Born in Silleda, a municipality of Pontevedra, López started playing football at the grassroots club San Tirso SD before joining Deportivo La Coruña in 2012. He came through each one of the club's youth ranks, as he was involved in the victory of the División de Honor Juvenil in 2021, and took part in Depor's consequent campaign in the UEFA Youth League.

At the start of the 2021-22 season, López was promoted to Deportivo La Coruña's first team, and subsequently made his professional debut on 29 August 2021, coming in for Miku Fedor at the 84th minute of the game against Celta Vigo B and scoring the final goal of a 5-0 win. In the occasion, the striker became Depor's first fully home-grown player to play and score in an official match with the senior squad. During the rest of the season, he featured regularly for the Galician side, scoring three other goals in the process, although the team eventually missed promotion to the Spanish second tier following a 2-1 defeat in the final against Albacete.

On 26 June 2022, Deportivo La Coruña officially announced that they had reached an agreement with Real Madrid for the transfer of López, starting from the 2022-23 season: the striker was then included in the squad of Real Madrid Castilla, the Blancos' reserve team.

International career 
López has represented Spain at youth international level, having played for the under-19 national team.

Career statistics

Club

References

External links 

 
 

2003 births
Living people
Spanish footballers
Footballers from Galicia (Spain)
Association football forwards
Primera Federación players
Deportivo de La Coruña players
Real Madrid Castilla footballers
Spain youth international footballers
Sportspeople from the Province of Pontevedra